Athel Cornish-Bowden (born 3 April 1943) is a British biochemist known for his numerous textbooks, particularly those on enzyme kinetics and his work on metabolic control analysis.

Education and career
Athel Cornish-Bowden worked on pepsin catalysis. This began a life long pursuit of work on enzyme catalysis and in later years work on the control of metabolism. More recently he has also turned his attention to work related to the origin and nature of life.

He obtained his D.Phil. at Oxford with Jeremy R. Knowles, and carried out post-doctoral work with Daniel E. Koshland Jr.

Research

Cornish-Bowden has authored over 200 peer-reviewed papers and nine textbooks on topics related to enzyme kinetics, mathematics and historical perspectives in science. According to Google Scholar, the textbook, Fundamentals of enzyme kinetics, has been cited over 3000 times by secondary sources.

Cornish-Bowden's research can be divided into three primary areas: Enzyme kinetics, metabolic control, done mainly in collaboration with Jannie Hofmeyr, and the origin of life. The following lists some of the topics and selected references to the work carried out and published by Cornish-Bowden:

Mechanisms of Pepsin Catalysis

Binding of ligands to Proteins

Kinetics of nitrite reductase

Kinetics of nitrate reductase

The evolution of macromolecules

Properties of multienzyme systems

The theory of self-organizing systems

His current interests include the definition of life and the capacity for life to self-organize.

Cornish-Bowden is most well known for his introduction of the direct-linear plot for estimating enzyme parameters, his work on Hexokinase evolution and kinetics, and his insight into the control and regulation of metabolism.

Editorial and Related Work 

Cornish-Bowden has participated on the editorial boards of  various journals (the Biochemical Journal, the Journal of Theoretical Biology, FEBS Journal, BioSystems), and has been active on International Committees. He was secretary of the IUPAC-IUBMB Joint Committee on Biochemical Nomenclature
and in that capacity convened the committee that prepared the current IUBMB recommendations on enzyme kinetics.
He also contributed to recommendations on biochemical thermodynamics, and to proposals for system representation of biochemical networks.

Books

Fundamentals of Enzyme Kinetics

References 

Systems biologists
Theoretical biologists
1943 births
Living people
British biochemists
Alumni of Wadham College, Oxford
British textbook writers